Hedvig Beata Marianne Bergström (née Björkman) (13 August 1921 - 12 October 2016) was a Swedish photographer. She is known for her portraits and dance and theatre images taken at the Royal Dramatic Theatre, Royal Swedish Opera, Vasa Theatre and other Stockholm theatres.

Career
Bergström studied at the Otte Sköld painting school in the late 1940s and then worked as a photography apprentice. She started her career as a theatre photographer in 1953 when she took photographs of the Cramer Ballet at the Chat Noir in Oslo.

At the same time, she photographed a rehearsal at the Royal Dramatic Theatre of Olof Molander's Oresteia for the Swedish newspaper Dagens Nyheter. This led to her working there for 30 years and a collaboration with Ingmar Bergman for about 10 years starting with Who's Afraid of Virginia Woolf?. She continued to work freelance at a number of theatres and dance companies including the Royal Swedish Opera, Gamla Stan Theatre, the Stockholm City Theatre, Vasateatern, Uppsala's Little Theatre, and Folkteatern. She also worked with the Swedish magazines Industria and Vi. She photographed numerous people in the Swedish theatrical scene including Ingmar Bergman, Anders Ek, Ernst-Hugo Järegård, Sif Ruud, Ulf Palme, Elsa-Marianne von Rosen, and Mimi Pollak.

Style
Up until Bergström, theatrical photography was staged, whereby actors and sets were arranged in tableaux. Bergström changed this by having a more documentary approach, where she photographed actual rehearsals and performances.

Personal life
Bergström had a son, Stefan, and lived until her death on 12 October 2016 in Järna, Sweden.

Exhibitions
Bergman in Focus – Nobel Laureates Find a Director, 21 September 2008 to 18 January 2009, Photographers K.G. Kristoffersson, Lennart Nilsson, Beata Bergström, Bo-Erik Gyberg, Per Adolphson, Arne Carlsson and Bengt Wanselius.
Photo, 19 April 2013 to 6 January 2014, Beata Bergström, Music and Theatre Museum, Stockholm.

Bibliography
Swedish Design, Denise Hagsromer, atelj'e bellander and Beata Bergström (photographs), Sweden, nordisk rotogravyr, 1958. 
Ten Years with the Royal Dramatic Theatre (in Swedish), Beata Bergström, Stockholm, Nord. rotogravure, 1964, OCLC Number 16689310 
Theater – Art of the Moment Captured in Photos (in Swedish), Beata Bergström, Stockholm, Natur & Kultur, 1976, 
The Dynamics of the Living (in Swedish), Beata Bergström, Stockholm, Kosmos, 1976, .
Beyond a broad ocean: Kristina (in Swedish), Beata Bergstro¨m, Jan Mark, Lars Rudolfsson, Joel Berg, Lund, Leander Malmsten, 1996, .

References

Further reading

External links
 artist search page of Moderna Museet that holds almost 200 of Bergström's works
 Obituary published in Dagens Nyheter on October 20, 2016, p. 32

1921 births
2016 deaths
Swedish women photographers
Swedish photographers
20th-century Swedish photographers
21st-century Swedish photographers
People from Uddevalla Municipality
Swedish theatre people
People from Järna
20th-century women photographers
21st-century women photographers
20th-century Swedish women